Joyce Chiang (December 7, 1970 – ) was an American attorney with the former Immigration and Naturalization Service who was the victim of a homicide. Chiang disappeared on January 9, 1999, in Washington, D.C., and was later found dead.  The story of her disappearance and the discovery of her remains in the Potomac River, which drew only local news coverage at the time, was rediscovered and received some national attention in the wake of the similar disappearance of Chandra Levy in May 2001. Chiang was the sister of future California State Treasurer John Chiang.

Life 
Joyce Chiang was one of four children and the only daughter of Taiwanese immigrants raised in Chicago and in Southern California. Her three brothers are John Chiang, who became Controller of the State of California in 2007 and Treasurer of California in 2015; Robert Chiang; and Roger Chiang, who is currently the Executive In Charge at the television show America's Most Wanted and in 1999 lived with Joyce and was working for the U.S. Department of Housing and Urban Development.

Chiang attended Smith College, where she was student government president in 1992. She graduated from the evening division of Georgetown University Law School in 1995, while working for Congressman Howard Berman as an immigration advisor. After earning her law  degree, she worked in the General Counsel's office of the Immigration and Naturalization Service.

Disappearance and death 
On January 9, 1999, the day of Chiang's disappearance, she had met with several friends for a movie and dinner, and one of those friends offered her a ride home. Chiang asked her friend to make one quick stop at the Starbucks at the intersection of Connecticut Avenue NW and R Street NW. Chiang told her friend that she would walk the four blocks home from the coffee shop, but she never made it to her apartment. Her brother Roger was her roommate and reported her missing. Because Chiang was a federal employee, the FBI took the lead in investigating the case.

A couple walking through Anacostia Park the next day found Chiang's billfold and turned it in to park police, who filed it in the park's lost and found. Four days later, the couple recognized Chiang's photo in media coverage and alerted the FBI, who arranged a search of the park and discovered her apartment keys, video and grocery cards, and gloves. The jacket in which Chiang was last seen was also found, torn down the back.

During the three-month span in which she was missing, a candlelight vigil was held every Saturday night in Dupont Circle. Her brother Roger was instrumental in several televised and print appeals for more information on her case and disappearance.

The cause of death could not be determined, and for more than 12 years it was considered a cold case.

In 2001, at the height of the media frenzy surrounding the disappearance of Chandra Levy, police had attempted to defrock a serial killer theory by stating that Chiang had committed suicide. Chiang's family turned to the media to dispel that notion. In January 2011, WTTG-Fox 5 reported that the police had solved Chiang's murder, identifying two suspects who had attempted to rob her on the night she disappeared.

In May 2011, D.C. police held a press conference in which they acknowledged that Chiang had not committed suicide, but was instead the victim of a homicide. They said that one suspect was in prison in Maryland for a different offense, and another suspect was living in Guyana, which has no extradition treaty with the U.S. According to WTTG-Fox 5, an unnamed "source familiar with the case has identified the men as Steve Allen and Neil Joaquin, two men who worked as a team abducting people off the street with the intention of robbing them." Partly based on similarities to another attack committed by the two men after Chiang's disappearance, police hypothesized that the men drove Chiang to the Anacostia River. On the day of the press conference, television host John Walsh stated that the men either threw Chiang into the river, or Chiang attempted to escape but slipped on the icy river bank and drowned. Although the police did not confirm or deny Walsh's theories, nor were any charges filed, Chiang's family expressed thanks for the closure of the case.

Chandra Levy connection 
In addition to the Congressional intern connection, Chiang had lived only four blocks away from where Chandra Levy would later take up residency, in Dupont Circle. Both were young, brunette women of petite stature. The Starbucks where Chiang was last seen was later frequented by Levy. These similarities have led to various theories that both women were killed by the same person, although the Congressman-in-sex-scandal aspect of Levy's case, coupled with the long time that passed before her body was found, led to more media interest.

Remembrances 
The Joyce Chiang Memorial Scholarship was established with the help of her family, to support one student each year with an internship at the Asian American Justice Center (AAJC) in Washington, D.C.

The Joyce Chiang Memorial Award was established at Georgetown University Law Center by her friends and colleagues. It supports "an evening student with a demonstrable commitment to public service."

See also
List of solved missing persons cases
List of unsolved murders

References

External links 
 Joe Harten, Georgetown Joins the Search For Missing Law School Alum, The Hoya, January 26, 1999
 Congressional Record, Farewell to Joyce Chiang, April 13, 1999
 Sam Chu Lin, Search for Chandra Levy Reopens Wounds for Family of Joyce Chiang, AsianWeek, July 27, 2001, page 11

1970 births
1990s missing person cases
1999 deaths
1999 murders in the United States
20th-century American lawyers
20th-century American women lawyers
American people of Taiwanese descent
Female murder victims
Georgetown University Law Center alumni
Lawyers from Chicago
Missing person cases in Washington, D.C.
People from Dupont Circle
People murdered in Washington, D.C.
Smith College alumni
University of Chicago Laboratory Schools alumni
Unsolved murders in the United States
American lawyers of Chinese descent
Women in Washington, D.C.
1999 in Washington, D.C.